Aaron Patzer (born November 20, 1980) is an Internet entrepreneur and the founder of Mint.com, a financial management tool which was acquired by Intuit and had over 10 million users as of mid-2012.

Biography
Born in Madison, Wisconsin, Patzer graduated from Central High School in Evansville, Indiana. He completed his undergraduate studies in 2002 with a BSEE from Duke University. In 2004, he completed an MSEE from Princeton University.

Patzer began his career in the Internet boom years of 1998–2000, working for Getawebsite.com and Miadora.com (an online jewelry store).

Mint.com 
After a number of engineering positions and Internet startups, Patzer founded Mint.com in March 2006.  According to Patzer, the inspiration for Mint.com came to him in late 2005 after being frustrated with how difficult it was to use the Intuit Quicken product.

Patzer developed the full alpha version of Mint.com (in Java J2EE and MySQL) in 2006 before he met Josh Kopelman (founder of half.com) and Rob Hayes at a STIRR dinner in the fall of 2006.  The meeting led to funding, and Patzer launched Mint.com at the TechCrunch40 conference a year later, in September 2007, winning the $50K first prize.

In September 2008, Patzer was listed in Inc. magazine's Top 30 Under 30.

On September 14, 2009, Intuit announced that it would buy Mint.com for US$170M. Patzer was criticized for selling the company for too little. At the time of the announced sale, Mint.com had an estimated 1.5 million users. Patzer joined Intuit as VP Product Innovation, and he is also working on a new personal transportation system.

Post-Mint
In 2011, TechCrunch reported that Patzer's next project would be called "Swift" and was exploring the "feasibility of building a personal maglev vehicle transit system." According to Patzer, he was splitting his time between the new venture and his position at Intuit. He left Intuit in December 2012 in order to be able to focus on his new ventures.

Patzer founded Leonardo Software Inc. in September 2013.

Fountain.com 
In 2013, Patzer launched Fountain.com along with Jean Sini, CTO. The main benefit to using Fountain is that you can connect with any expert, on mostly any topic, for free from your smartphone. Fountain.com was sold to Porch.com in October 2015. Patzer stepped down as CEO and did not join Porch. Instead, he relocated overseas for personal reasons. Sini became the leader of Porch's San Francisco office.

Vital Software 
In 2017, Patzer relocated to Auckland, New Zealand, to start Vital Software Ltd. Vital is said to "bring that consumer-focused mindset to emergency rooms and hospitals to help them organize patient flow."

References 

Duke University Pratt School of Engineering alumni
Living people
Princeton University alumni
People from Evansville, Indiana
American financial company founders
American technology company founders
Intuit people
American people of German descent
1980 births